Entertainment Software Association of Canada (ESAC) is a not for profit trade association serving the business and public affairs needs of companies in Canada that develop, publish and distribute computer and video games for video game consoles, handheld devices, personal computers and the Internet. ESAC's services include, business and consumer research, government relations, and media relations. The organization was founded in October 2004 by a group of industry leaders and major companies in the Canadian video game industry. 

The organization's first Executive Director was Danielle LaBossiere Parr who led the organization from inception until 2012. Since then the association has been led by Jayson Hilchie who has served as its President & CEO. The association's members include the country's largest publishers and distributors of interactive entertainment software, which together accounted for more than 90% of the $2 billion in entertainment hardware and software sales in Canada in 2009.

ESAC's members include Canada's leading interactive entertainment software developers, publishers and distributors. 

In 2019 the Canadian entertainment software industry included 700 studios and provided 27,700 direct jobs and 22,000 more in indirect and related fields across the country.

Origins
The ESAC was founded in October, 2004 from the previous Canadian Interactive Digital Software Association as a wholly Canadian entity.

Members

ESAC represents a large number of the leading video game publishers, developers, and distributors with operations in Canada.

References

External links

Business organizations based in Canada
Video game trade associations
Video gaming in Canada